The 1997 FIFA Confederations Cup Final was a football match to determine the winners of the 1997 FIFA Confederations Cup. The match was held at King Fahd II Stadium, Riyadh, Saudi Arabia, on 21 December 1997 and was contested by Brazil and Australia. Brazil won the match 6–0.

Route to the final

Match details

References 

Match report

Final
1997
 
Confederations Cup Final
Brazil national football team matches
FIFA 1997
December 1997 sports events in Asia